Chhota Bheem: Kung Fu Dhamaka is a 2019 Indian action-adventure martial arts drama film written and directed by Rajiv Chilaka. The film is based on the characters Chhota Bheem and his friends. This is the 4th theatrical film of Chhota Bheem. The film was distributed by Yash Raj Films and released in Hindi and English in 2D and 3D version.

Synopsis 
Bheem, now stronger than ever, is in the kingdom of China, participating in the emperor's annual martial art competition. The world's top fighters have assembled there, and Bheem has his whole gang of friends from Dholakpur with him.

The competition starts with Kalia to participating and while Bheem fights his way through the rounds. Kalia gets beaten and drops out. In the middle of the fight, Zuhu, an evil part demon and nephew to the emperor returns after being banished from the kingdom and kidnaps the daughter to the emperor, Princess Kia. Bheem gives chase, over rooftops and treacherous ravines, but Zuhu disappears with the princess.

Bheem is up against it, with his friends', Emperor Jian's and Dragonland's peoples' Support. Bheem goes after Zuhu, along the way freeing the people, Zuhu held as his slaves and rescuing princess Kia earning love and respect in the land of the dragon.

Characters

Regular characters 
 Bheem — Bheem has been training in the martial art of Kung Fu. King Indravarma wanted Bheem to go to and take part in the world's most prestigious martial arts event.
 Chutki — Long time friend, Chutki always has a nugget of wisdom up her sleeve. She is the brains to the brawn of the team.
 Raju — Slightly older than a toddler, Raju is as enthusiastic and fearless as Bheem. 
 Jaggu — Bheem's compatriot from Dholakpur, the talking walking monkey, knows how to kick a leg both in a fight and while having fun. 
 Kalia — Bheem's lifelong friend and troublemaker, Kalia loves food. He takes part in the Kung Fu competition and gets beaten.
 Dholu & Bholu — The twins are the young jokesters of the gang from Dholakpur, more buddies of Kalia but equally a part of Bheem's gang from Dholakpur.

Film specific characters 
 Ming – A naughty young lad, street smart, a martial art student, a friend to Kia's and a friend of Bheem and gang who are the emperor's guests from Dholakpur. Brave Ming puts his life on the line to rescue princess Kia. He previously appeared in Chhota Bheem: Master of Shaolin. He is heir of Shaolin's Head Guru (Bade Guru) as a head of Shaolin Kung-fu school. 
 Kia — A Daughter to emperor Jian, Princess of dragon land, princess Kia is the life and blood of the kingdom of China. She is a happy child until Zuhu returns to China.
 Zuhu — A long thin scar runs on Zuhu's face, reminding him of the day when his uncle emperor Jian kicks him out of the kingdom, abolishing him for life. In Zuhu's mind, he had always been the heir to the throne. But then the dragon lords chose Kia, and Zuhu burning with rage one night, picked up a knife and raised it on baby Kia. Emperor  Jian stopped him, broken all of their years together and banished Zuhu from the kingdom. But after years of planning, plotting, learning, Zuhu is more powerful than ever, a part demon who could summon dark forces at his will. This time he is taking princess Kia, and all the powers she possesses, and no one in the entire kingdom can stop him.
 Emperor Jian — A decades-old act of mercy by emperor Jian comes back to haunt him when his nephew returns and kidnaps Jian's daughter Kia. The once mighty emperor of China is now a heartbroken man.

Reception 
The Times of India gave the movie 3 stars out of 5 and said, "Despite the minor hiccups, ‘Chhota Bheem: Kung Fu Dhamaka’ largely works due to its strong emotional content." The Indo-Asian News Service (IANS) wrote, "The plot and the screenplay, though laced with verbose exposition, is uncomplicated, smooth and direct with not much emphasis given to the finer nuances of Kung Fu. Nevertheless, the well-designed action sequences are crisp, relevant and lack the fun element that was noticed in the previous Chhota Bheem editions. The dialogues, too sound bland and unimpressive."

Television series 
The film was spin-off into an Indian 3D-animated television series of the same name, which started in 2020.

See also
Indian animation industry
List of indian animated feature films
Chhota Bheem and the Curse of Damyaan
Chhota Bheem and the Throne of Bali
Chhota Bheem

References

External links 
 

Indian animated films
2019 animated films
2019 films
Animated films based on animated series
Chhota Bheem
Films distributed by Yash Raj Films
Indian martial arts films
Kung fu films
Animated action films
Films set in China
Indian children's films
Indian computer-animated films
2019 martial arts films
English-language Indian films
Indian multilingual films
2019 multilingual films
Films adapted into television shows